Melitturga clavicornis is a species of insect belonging to the family Andrenidae.

It is native to Europe.

References

Andrenidae